Hemmantia is a monotypic genus of flowering plants belonging to the family Monimiaceae. The only species is Hemmantia webbii.

Its native range is Queensland.

References

Monimiaceae
Monimiaceae genera
Monotypic Laurales genera